Md. Abdur Rashid Khan is a Bangladesh Nationalist Party politician and the former Member of Parliament of Barisal-6.

Career
Khan was elected to parliament from Barisal-6 as a Bangladesh Nationalist Party candidate in 1995 by-election following the death of the incumbent member of parliament, Md. Yunus Khan.

References

Bangladesh Nationalist Party politicians
Living people
5th Jatiya Sangsad members
Year of birth missing (living people)